Thomas Henry Hassall (11 September 1844 - 17 February 1920) was an Anglo-Australian politician.

Early life
Born on 11 September 1844 in Ashby-de-la-Zouch, Leicestershire, England. He was educated at Loughborough Grammar School.

Australia
Hassall arrived in Sydney in 1861 on board the White Start liner. He made his way up to Lambing Flat and after working in the interior as a miner, drover and contractor, settled in Moree in 1867.  He was elected to the New South Wales Legislative Assembly in 1886 for the district of Gwydir, until its first abolition in 1894, and represented the replacement district of Moree until he retired in 1901. Hassall held the portfolio of Secretary for Lands in the Lyne ministry, from 1899 to 1901.

South Africa
In 1901 Hassall moved to South Africa. He was  associated with the Federal Cold Storage but deciding on a quiet life, he became a country hotel keeper in Natal. In 1915 he settled at Chelmsford Hotel, Tongaat, on the Natal north coast.

After a long illness, he died on Tuesday 17 February 1920, at his residence, Chelmsford Hotel, and was buried at Verulam Cemetery.

References

 

1844 births
1920 deaths
Members of the New South Wales Legislative Assembly
People educated at Loughborough Grammar School
Australian stockmen